Hacallı, Barda may refer to:
Hacallı (40° 14' N 47° 16' E), Barda, Azerbaijan
Hacallı (40° 27' N 47° 05' E), Barda, Azerbaijan
İkinci Hacallı, Azerbaijan